The Buffalo Club is the only studio album by the American country music group The Buffalo Club. It was released on March 25, 1997 via Rising Tide Records. The album included the singles "If She Don't Love You", "Nothin' Less Than Love", and "Heart Hold On".

Critical reception
It received a mostly unfavorable review from Country Standard Time magazine, whose critic Robert Loy said "the harmonies are above average, and Ron Hemby's vocals deserve better material than anything here." A more favorable review came from Billboard, which compared the band favorably to the Eagles and praised the "crisp production".

Track listing

Personnel
As listed in liner notes.

The Buffalo Club
John Dittrich – harmony vocals, drums
Ron Hemby – lead vocals, acoustic guitar
Charlie Kelley – harmony vocals, electric guitar

Additional musicians
Eddie Bayers – drums
Barry Beckett – keyboards
Tom Hemby – acoustic guitar
Ric Latina – electric guitar
Mike Lawler – synthesizer
Phil Naish – keyboards
Michael Rhodes – bass guitar
Chris Rodriguez – acoustic guitar
Mike Severs – electric guitar
Mark Thompson – drums
Biff Watson – acoustic guitar

Singles

References

1997 debut albums
The Buffalo Club albums
Rising Tide Records albums
Albums produced by Barry Beckett